Gordon Parry (24 July 1908 – 6 May 1981) was a British film director and producer.

Early life
He was born in Aintree, Liverpool, on 24 July 1908.

Career
He worked on the crew of such films as Strictly Illegal (1935) and was a key member of the team at Two Cities Films.

He directed his first film Bond Street in 1948. He died on 6 May 1981.

Personal life
He had 2 daughters, the actress Natasha Parry, who was married to the director Peter Brook, and Nina.

Selected filmography

Non director
Strictly Illegal (1935) - unit producer
The Stoker (1937) - unit producer
In Which We Serve (1942) - location manager
The Demi-Paradise (1943) - assistant to producer
The Way to the Stars (1945) - associate producer
 Night Was Our Friend (1951) - producer

As director
 Bond Street (1948)
 Third Time Lucky (1948)
Now Barabbas (1949)
 Golden Arrow (1949)
Midnight Episode (1950)
Tom Brown's Schooldays (1951)
Twilight Women (1952)
Innocents in Paris (1953)
 Front Page Story (1954)
 Fast and Loose (1954)
A Yank in Ermine (1955)
 Sailor Beware! (1956)
A Touch of the Sun (1956)
 The Surgeon's Knife (1957)
 Tread Softly Stranger (1958)
Friends and Neighbours (1959)
The Navy Lark (1959)
The Adventures of Robin Hood (1960) (TV series)

References

External links
 

1908 births
1981 deaths
British film directors
British film producers
People from Aintree
Film people from Liverpool